Tommy Wright may refer to:

 Tommy A. Wright (born 1952), member of the Florida Senate
 Thomas D. Wright (born 1956), known as Tommy, former member of the Louisiana House of Representatives
 Tommy Wright (footballer, born 1928) (1928–2011), Scottish footballer, played for Sunderland
 Tommy Wright (footballer, born 1944), English footballer who played for Everton
 Tommy Wright (footballer, born 1963), Northern Ireland footballer
 Tommy Wright (footballer, born 1966), Scottish footballer who played for Leicester City
 Tommy Wright (footballer, born 1984), English footballer and manager who has played for Aberdeen, Forest Green Rovers and Darlington
 Tommy Wright III (born 1976), American rapper and record producer
 Tommy Wright (actor) (1926–1999), appeared in The Elephant Man and Mary Shelley's Frankenstein

See also 
 Thomas Wright (disambiguation)
 Tom Wright (disambiguation)